Cassandro is a 2023 American biographical drama film directed by Roger Ross Williams, from a screenplay by Ross Williams and David Teague. It stars Gael García Bernal, Roberta Colindrez, Perla De La Rosa, Joaquín Cosío, Raúl Castillo, El Hijo del Santo and Bad Bunny.

It had its world premiere at the 2023 Sundance Film Festival on January 20, 2023.
Cassandro is scheduled to be released by Amazon Studios via Prime Video.

Cast
 Gael García Bernal as Cassandro
 Roberta Colindrez 
 Perla De La Rosa as Yocasta
 Joaquín Cosío as Lorenzo
 Raúl Castillo as Gerardo 
 El Hijo del Santo
 Bad Bunny

Production
In July 2020, Gael García Bernal joined the cast of the film, with Roger Ross Williams set to direct from a screenplay he wrote alongside David Teague, with Amazon Studios in negotiations to distribute. In June 2021, Roberta Colindrez and Bad Bunny joined the cast of the film, with Amazon Studios officially set to distribute.

Release
It had its world premiere at the 2023 Sundance Film Festival on January 20, 2023.  The film is scheduled to be released by Amazon Studios via Prime Video.

Reception 
On review aggregator website Rotten Tomatoes, the film has an approval rating of 100% based on 36 reviews, with an average rating of 8.2/10. On Metacritic, it has a weighted average score of 81 out of 100 based on 12 critics, indicating "universal acclaim".

References

External links
 
2023 films
2023 drama films
2023 independent films
2023 directorial debut films
2023 LGBT-related films
Biographical films about LGBT people
Biographical films about sportspeople
American biographical drama films
Lucha libre films
Exóticos
Wrestling films
Films shot in Mexico
Films scored by Marcelo Zarvos
2020s American films
American LGBT-related films